Abasolo is a small town that is part of the municipality of Rodeo in the Mexican state of Durango.  Its correct name would be Abasolo, Rodeo, Dgo. for it is not independent.

Geography
It is located next to the Nazas River which originates at the Sierra Madre Occidental.
The nearest city is Rodeo, which is the head of the municipality.
This particular town has no more room to grow due to its location in between the river and a mountain, therefore many of its population has fled to the nearby towns or cities.

Economy
The only shopping avenues are in the form of tienditas, which are house front stores. 
Most of the people live from farms where they grow chili, corn, tomatoes, watermelon, sweet potato, and fish from the Nazas River.
  

Populated places in Durango